Hyponephele brevistigma is a butterfly species belonging to the family Nymphalidae. It can be found in Afghanistan, northern Pakistan, Kashmir, western Pamirs and the southern slope of the Alai Mountains.

Adults are on wing from June to August.

Subspecies
Hyponephele brevistigma brevistigma
Hyponephele brevistigma evanescens (western Pamirs)
Hyponephele brevistigma alaina (southern slope of the Alaisky mountains)

References

Species info

Hyponephele
Butterflies of Asia
Butterflies described in 1893